Brophy Hill is a summit in the U.S. state of Oregon.

Brophy Hill was named in the 1930s after Vern Brophy Whome, a local cattleman.

References

Mountains of Jackson County, Oregon
Mountains of Oregon